On the Turntable is a mix album released by Biz Markie. A follow-up was released in 2000, titled On the Turntable 2.

Track listing
"My Automobile"- 2:04  
"Which Way"- 1:17  
"I Like It"- 1:00  
"L.A. Jazz Song"- :46  
"I'll Play the Blues for You"- 1:58  
"The 24 Carat Black Theme"- :54  
"Skin Valley Serenade"- :57  
"Nasty Soul"- 2:23  
"Ghetto: Misfortune's Wealth"- 1:20  
"I'll Never Grow Old"- 2:31  
"Do Me"- 1:49  
"Memphis B.K."- 1:49  
"I'll Take You There"- 2:38  
"Mr. Big Stuff"- 2:02  
"Mama's Gone"- 3:09  
"Saginaw County Line"- 1:50  
"Do the Funky Penguin, Pt. 2"- 4:23  
"I Don't See Me in Your Eyes Anymore"- 2:38  
"Sister Sanctified"- 2:28  
"All We Need Is Understanding"- 2:23  
"Don't Send Me an Invitation"- 2:22  
"Tramp"- 3:23  
"Aquarius"- :52  
"Free Your Mind"- 2:31  

Biz Markie albums
1998 compilation albums
Albums produced by Biz Markie